Aloise "Alexei" Yegorovich Trupp (8 April 1856 – 17 July 1918) was the Latvian head footman in the household of Tsar Nicholas II of Russia.

Trupp was an ethnic Latgalian, born in Rezhitsky Uyezd, in the Vitebsk Governorate of the Russian Empire (now Madona Municipality, Latvia). He was executed with the Romanov family at Ipatiev House in Yekaterinburg following the Russian Revolution of 1917. He is buried in the Chapel of Saint Catherine the Martyr within the Saints Peter and Paul Cathedral.

Together with the royal family, Trupp was canonized as a martyr by the Russian Orthodox Church Outside Russia in 1981, even though he was a Roman Catholic. The Moscow Patriarchate canonized the royal family as Passion Bearers in 2000, but did not canonize Trupp.

See also 
 Romanov sainthood

References

External links 

 

20th-century Christian saints
20th-century Roman Catholics
1858 births
1918 deaths
Canonised servants of the Romanov household
Court of Nicholas II of Russia
Executed Latvian people
Executed Russian people
People executed by Russia by firing squad
People from Madona Municipality
People from Rezhitsky Uyezd
Russian Roman Catholics
Victims of Red Terror in Soviet Russia